Kenneth John Reed (15 December 1931 - 19 July 2018) was an Australian rules footballer who played with Essendon in the Victorian Football League (VFL). He won a reserves premiership with Essendon in 1952 and a year later was awarded the reserves best and fairest. Reed later played for Williamstown in the Victorian Football Association and won two premierships with them, before concluding his career with Hastings.

Notes

External links 		
		

Essendon Football Club past player profile
 The VFA project: Ken Reed.

1931 births
Australian rules footballers from Victoria (Australia)
Place of birth missing
Essendon Football Club players
Williamstown Football Club players
Mornington Peninsula Nepean Football League players
2018 deaths